The Atlantic 44 is a Greek sailboat that was designed by Daniel Andrieu as a cruiser-racer and first built in 1990.

The Atlantic 44 is a development of the Sun Magic 44, a boat that was built from 1987 to 1993 by Jeanneau in France. The design was licensed for construction by Olympic Marine in Greece.

Production
The design was built by Olympic Marine in Greece, starting in 1990, but it is now out of production.

Design
The Atlantic 44 is a recreational keelboat, built predominantly of fiberglass, with wood trim. It has a masthead sloop rig. The hull has a raked stem, a reverse transom, an internally mounted spade-type rudder controlled by a wheel tiller and a fixed fin keel. It displaces  and carries  of ballast.

See also
List of sailing boat types

References

Keelboats
1990s sailboat type designs
Sailing yachts
Sailboat type designs by Daniel Andrieu
Sailboat types built by Olympic Marine